Cresserons is a commune in the Calvados department in the Normandy region in northwestern France.

Cresserons is located just south of the beaches of Normandy. During the Battle of Normandy in the Second World War, British troops arrived there and a battle was fought on 7 June 1944.

Population

See also
Communes of the Calvados department

References

Communes of Calvados (department)
Calvados communes articles needing translation from French Wikipedia